Jane Fernandes (born Jane Frances Kelleher; August 21, 1956, in Worcester, Massachusetts) is a Deaf American educator and social justice advocate. As of August 2021, Fernandes is the President of Antioch College in Yellow Springs, Ohio.

In 2014, Fernandes became the first Deaf woman to lead an American college or university, serving at Guilford College through July 2021. She succeeded Kent Chabotar becoming the first woman to hold this position. Fernandes was formally inaugurated as the first female and the ninth president of Guilford College. In 1990, Jane Fernandes became the first Deaf woman to lead an American school designed for deaf, hard of hearing, blind, and deaf-blind students, serving at the Hawaii School for the Deaf and Blind in Honolulu until August 1995.

Early life and education
Fernandes was raised in Worcester and is the oldest child of Richard Paul and Mary Kathleen (née Cosgrove) Kelleher. Her father was a lawyer and judge serving in Worcester, Barnstable, and Falmouth. Her mother was deaf and raised to speak, read, and write English, and was a trained golfer, following in her parents' footsteps. Fernandes, who was born deaf, was raised in the same way. She attended Worcester public schools before any state or federal laws required accommodations for deafness. She received intensive hearing and speech instruction through a partnership between home and school. While attending graduate school, Fernandes learned American Sign Language (ASL) and become involved with the Deaf community.

As Jane Kelleher, she attended Trinity College, earning a B.A. degree in French and comparative literature. Kelleher attended the Middlebury College language school in French over two summers and studied in Cassis, France. At Trinity, in 1977 and 1978, Kelleher received the John Curtis Underwood Memorial Poetry Prize and the comparative literature book prize for her senior thesis. At The University of Iowa, Kelleher earned her M.A. and Ph.D., in comparative literature with emphasis on French poetry in historical depth, 
Renaissance and Baroque drama and American Sign Language literature. At Iowa, Kelleher received the Phillip G. Hubbard Human Rights Award.

Career
After graduating from Iowa, Fernandes did academic work centered in Deaf Language and Culture. Fernandes coordinated the American Sign Language and Interpreting Programs at Northeastern University before going to Gallaudet University as chair of Sign Communication. The next move was to Honolulu, Hawaii where Fernandes established an Interpreter Education Program at Kapiolani Community College, taught Deaf Education at the University of Hawaii, Manoa, and served for five years at the Hawaii School for the Deaf and the Blind In Hawaii, Fernandes provided leadership that recognized American Sign Language as a bona fide language. Fernandes also fostered the understanding of Hawaiian Sign Language as the Sign Language of Indigenous Peoples on the islands. She received the Alice Cogswell Award in 1993 from Gallaudet University for valuable service on behalf of deaf citizens.

Upon resuming service to Gallaudet University in 1995, Fernandes served as Vice President of the National Deaf Education Center.  The Education of the Deaf Act of 1986  Fernandes led the development, evaluation, and dissemination of projects to improve deaf education nationwide. Derived from three priorities: (1) literacy for all deaf children, (2) the transition from high school to postsecondary education, work, careers, and (3) family involvement in a deaf child's life, her leadership encompassed the nationally acclaimed Shared Reading Project, Families Count! (Levels 1, 2, and 3), Decision Maker, and The Nine Areas of Literacy books and videotapes. In 1999, she proposed the creation of the Cochlear Implant Education Center at Kendall Demonstration Elementary School which was established in 2000. Through this inclusive program, she enabled clarity that American Sign Language and cochlear implant technology are both important to the development of deaf infants, toddlers, and youth.

In 2000, President I. King Jordan named Fernandes provost of the university without consulting the faculty, a move which Jordan called "a terrible mistake".  In spite of a rough start, Fernandes' accomplishments included playing a lead role in Gallaudet's capital campaign that raised $28 million for the Sorenson Language and Communication Center, a second comprehensive campaign that raised $39 million, $9 million over its goal, creating the World Deaf Leadership scholarship with funding from the Nippon Foundation, and tripling the dollar amount of research grants awarded—including the National Science Foundation Science of Learning grant and a $1.2 million federal appropriation to engage students and professors in scientific research.

Her signature work is reflected in the Board-approved strategic plan "New Directions for Academic Affairs" which called for Gallaudet University to model what it means to be an inclusive deaf university in all aspects of its operations, academic, and community life. Inclusion at Gallaudet University refers to a hierarchy of privilege within the deaf community overlaid and compounded by other diverse human attributes; for example, being deaf, hard of hearing, or deaf-blind, having deaf, hard of hearing, or hearing parents, speaking/signing American Sign Language, English, or another hearing language at home, the language used in school, attending a deaf or hearing school, having a deaf or hearing partner or spouse, generations of deaf people in the family, having deaf, hard of hearing, or hearing children, and so on within the broader context of race, ethnicity, gender expression, LGBTQ identity, socioeconomic class, national origin or citizenship, language, ability or disability, and other human categorizations.

Upon the retirement of Jordan, she applied for the university presidency. In the application, Fernandes wrote:

Her presidential platform, "Many Ways of Being Deaf," articulated work to be done throughout the university to include, value, and respect students, faculty, and staff of all races and all ways of being deaf, hard of hearing, and deaf-blind. Naming racism and audism as systemic issues at Gallaudet caused a strong reaction to Fernandes' appointment as Gallaudet University president. Audism, defined by Tom Humphries, is (discrimination based on the ability to hear or behave in the manner of one who hears). Scores of students protested against her appointment. According to The Washington Post, "Students objected to the appointment of Jane Fernandes, who is Deaf and is currently the university's provost because she did not grow up using American Sign Language. Some students also criticized Fernandes for not having warm relations with students." Protestors objected to Fernandes because she was "not Deaf enough." One flier handed out in the protest attacked her because "her mother and brother are deaf, but use spoken language." When this did not resonate with the public, the protestors clarified that they believed she lacked the charisma to represent deaf people to the world.

Protestors perceived that Fernandes, having learned ASL as an adult, was insufficiently committed to addressing the problem of audism (discrimination based on the ability to hear or behave in the manner of one who hears). The student paper took polls a few days before the selection. Of those faculty members who responded, 36% gave Fernandes an "acceptable" rating, compared to 53% and 64% for two other finalists.

On October 29, 2006, six months after the Board selected her as president, but before she had assumed the position, the Board of Trustees of Gallaudet University rescinded her contract to be the ninth President of Gallaudet.

Thereafter, Fernandes served as a Senior Fellow at the Johnnetta B. Cole Global Diversity and Inclusion Institute. As Provost and Vice Chancellor for Academic Affairs at the University of North Carolina at Asheville, her team collaborated on a partnership resulting in Asheville hosting the UNC Eshelman School of Pharmacy on its campus. She was widely applauded for her successful efforts to increase diversity, equity, and inclusion throughout the university's operations. She teamed with Chancellor Anne Ponder in fundraising to establish three endowed professorships and she secured significant support from private foundations. In 202l Fernandes led a university-wide team in the nearly perfect ten-year reaffirmation of accreditation of UNC Asheville. A major part of that effort involved developing student learning outcomes and measuring the university's success in students achieving expected learning outcomes.

In partnership with the Guilford College campus community, Fernandes launched the Guilford Edge, innovative and shared student experiences, consisting of learning collaboratively, integrating advising, leading ethically, and rallying campus spirit. The Edge resulted in an enrollment turnaround and measurable progress through an 8% increase in new students, a 6% increase in retention of current students, a record low of 17% D, F, W or NC (no credit) grades, and on average, students completing 1/2 credit more per semester. In addition to the enrollment and academic increases, Fernandes is credited with investing in core values-based restorations to provide healthy and safe accommodations and preserve building infrastructure for centuries to come. The college's construction and restoration team designed collaborative teaching and learning spaces to support the Guilford Edge.  The establishment of a Cabinet-level Vice President of Diversity, Equity, and Inclusion resulted in diversity being central to every College decision.  President Fernandes supported gender equity in athletic participation, practice, and experience necessary for the student body.
 	
Fernandes made difficult decisions to furlough and lay off colleagues during the COVID-19 pandemic and announced that she would leave office on June 30, 2021. The Guilford Board awarded her a one-year sabbatical and transition to a tenured faculty position in English. In August 2021 Antioch College announced the selection of Jane Fernandes as their next president.

She is a Founding member of the Presidents' Alliance on Higher Education and Immigration, where she is currently a Steering Committee member. Formed in 2017, the college and university leaders' alliance is dedicated to increasing public awareness of how immigration policies and practices impact students, college campuses, and communities.  Fernandes advocated on behalf of Guilford College's DACA students and alumni for a bipartisan Congressionally approved path to citizenship.  On July 31, 2020, Guilford College achieved victory in a federal lawsuit on behalf of international students at Guilford College and throughout the nation.

References

External links
 
 Washington Post coverage of the controversy: May 2 May 3 May 5 May 10 May 15

1956 births
Educators of the deaf
Living people
Trinity College (Connecticut) alumni
University of North Carolina at Asheville faculty
University of Iowa alumni
Women heads of universities and colleges
People from Worcester, Massachusetts
American deaf people
American women academics
21st-century American women